Francisco Chavarría Valdeolívar (born 2 April 1954) is a Mexican politician affiliated with the Party of the Democratic Revolution. He served as Deputy of the LIX Legislature of the Mexican Congress representing Guerrero and previously served as municipal president of Petatlán from 1990 to 1993.

References

1954 births
Living people
Politicians from Guerrero
Members of the Chamber of Deputies (Mexico) for Guerrero
Party of the Democratic Revolution politicians
20th-century Mexican politicians
21st-century Mexican politicians
Municipal presidents in Guerrero
Deputies of the LIX Legislature of Mexico